Les Bleus : premiers pas dans la police (literally "The Rookies: first steps in the police", often shortened to Les Bleus) is a French police television series about five rookie police officers learning the ropes. Episodes center on the young protagonists' amusing attempts to solve and prevent crimes with the help of their seasoned superiors. Though their lack of experience creates many humorous situations, the series is primarily an action-adventure police drama. Most of the action takes place at the Commissariat (Police Station) and on the streets of Paris.

As the story progresses, the rookies form a tight knit group while continuing to develop their outside relationships. Each character has to face his own ethical dilemmas, often having to choose between upholding the law and loyalty to those closest to them.

The series was created by Stéphane Giusti, Alain Robillard and Alain Tasma. It aired from February 8, 2006 until October 16, 2010 on France's M6.

Characters

The Rookies (Les Bleus)

Non-Rookie Police and Other Supporting Characters

Guest
 Emil Abossolo-Mbo as Professor Hassan
 Émilie Gavois-Kahn as Anaïs
 Eric Godon as Artiguste
 François Levantal as Boris Lukacs
 Françoise Bertin as Madame Tubin
 Guillaume Gouix as Marco
 Joseph Malerba as Lieutenant Simoni
 Marie-Christine Adam as Madame Magnard
 Nicolas Marié as Gilbert Mourier
 Olivier Broche as Cyrille Vauquier
 Philippe Laudenbach
 Riton Liebman as The medical examiner

Episodes

Pilot (2006)
 Pilot (Pilote) 90 minutes

First season (2007)
 Collateral Damage (Dommage collatélral)
 Hard Life (Une vie de chien)
 Ghost of the Past (Fantôme du passé)
 Mansions (Hôtels particuliers)
 Eyes Closed (Les Yeux fermés)
 Old Flames (Retour de flammes)
 Hostages (Otages)
 Pretenses (Faux-semblants)
 Everything's Wrong (Rien ne va plus)
 Infiltration (Infiltration)
 Internal Investigation Part 1 (Enquête interne [1/2])
 Internal Investigation Part 2 (Enquête interne [2/2])

Second season (2009)
 Behind Bars (Derrière les barreaux)
 Fresh Start (Nouveau depart)
 Dangerous Games (Jeux dangereux)
 Abduction Alert (Alerte enlèvement)
 TBA (Devoir de mémoire)
 Point Blank (À bout portant)

Third season (2010)
 Un voisin encombrant
 Faillites collectives
 L'Envers du décor
 Le Passé retrouvé
 Amour fou
 À mains nues
 La Tentation d'Alex
 Corps étrangers

Fourth season (2010) 
 Sur la touche
 Une affaire de famille
 Sexe, mensonge et vidéo
 Un père et manque
 Bijoux de famille
 Chambre avec vue
 24 heures presque chrono
 À double tranchant

Soundtrack

Theme Song
"No Tomorrow" by Orson.

Other Songs
 "Everywhen" by Massive Attack
 "A Little Bit Strange" by Immersion
 "I can't forgive" by Béatrice Lang
 "Torturé" by Fabrice Aboulker
 "La Nuit Je Mens" by Alain BashungPlayed in the last scene of season three when Kévin asks Yann to marry him.Also played at the end of the last episode of the series as Kévin leaves the force and goes to Mexico.

Awards
Festival du film de télévision de Luchon 2006 :
Grand Prize for Series
Best Young Actor : Mhamed Arezki
Festival de la fiction TV de La Rochelle 2007 :
Best Prime Time Series

See also
 List of French television series

References

External links
 
 Les Bleus on Allociné

French police procedural television series
French drama television series
French action television series
French comedy television series
Television shows set in Paris
Television shows set in France
French-language television shows
2006 French television series debuts
2010 French television series endings
2000s French television series
2010s French television series
French LGBT-related television shows
Same-sex marriage in television
M6 (TV channel) original programming